The Cagiva GP500 was a Grand Prix 500cc two-stroke motorcycle manufactured by Cagiva. It was released in various iterations (C587, V593, C594, etc.) throughout the years it was raced. Racing greats including Eddie Lawson, Randy Mamola, John Kocinski, Doug Chandler, Alex Barros and Mat Mladin, all raced versions of the GP500 at one time in their careers.

Eddie Lawson's win in the 1992 Hungarian motorcycle Grand Prix at the Hungaroring was the first 500cc Motorcycle Grand Prix victory for the Cagiva GP500.

References

C594
Grand Prix motorcycles
Motorcycles introduced in 1987
Two-stroke motorcycles